Subject to Change may refer to:
Subject to Change (band)
Subject to Change (EP), a 1983 EP by The Faith
Subject to Change (Kelsea Ballerini album), 2022
Subject to Change (Switched album), 2002
Subject to Change (Vanessa-Mae album), 2001
Subject to Change (Henry Threadgill album), 1985
Subject to Change (film), a stand up DVD by comedian Danny Bhoy